Perigonia lefebvraei is a moth of the family Sphingidae first described by Hippolyte Lucas in 1857. It is known from Cuba and the Dominican Republic.

It is similar to Perigonia lusca lusca, but smaller and the forewing upperside antemedian band is vestigial or absent and the posterior half of the hindwing upperside is more uniformly grey brown.

The larvae have been recorded feeding on Ferdinandusa angustata and Guettarda species.

References

Perigonia
Moths described in 1857